Chalcosyrphus nigripes is a species of hoverfly in the family Syrphidae.

Distribution
Sweden.

References

Eristalinae
Insects described in 1838
Diptera of Europe
Taxa named by Johan Wilhelm Zetterstedt